A sports ticket derivative is a type of futures contract specifically for sports tickets.  Typical terms of a ticket future contract stipulate that a ticket to a specific game (typically a championship game, such as Super Bowl or World Series) is delivered to the holder of the contract contingent on a specific team making it to that event.  Ticket futures were first offered by yoonew in 2004, under the title of Team Fantasy Seats.

History
Sports ticket futures were first offered in 2004 by yoonew.  They came in the form of Team Fantasy Seats which allowed investors and fans to buy a contract for a Super Bowl or NCAA Final Four ticket contingent on a specific team reaching the event.

As of September, 2008, yoonew has offered sports ticket derivatives for the Super Bowl, NFC Championship Game, AFC Championship Game, NCAA Men's Final Four, College Football BCS National Championship Game, NBA Finals, MLB World Series, Stanley Cup Finals, and UEFA European Football Championship. Launching in 2011 Ticketscore.com is the current leader within this marketplace offering ticket derivatives for the NFL, MLB, NHL, NBA and major collegiate sports.

How it works
For example, you could purchase a Team Fantasy Seat through yoonew for the New York Giants at a market-based price.  If the Giants make it to the Super Bowl, the holder of the contract receives a Super Bowl ticket at no additional cost. Ticketscore.com allows you to buy into a price reduced team contract and pay over a term of up to 26 weeks.

See also
yoonew
Futures contract
Futures exchange
Ticket resale

References

Sports terminology
Derivatives (finance)